Sphaeromatidae (marine pillbug family) is a family of isopods, often encountered on rocky shores and in shelf waters in temperate zones. The family includes almost 100 genera and 619 known marine species (and about 65 in fresh water). Within these genera, there are groups that share  distinctive morphologies; further research may reclassify these genus-groups as separate families.

Description
Many species have a dorsoventrally compressed body shape, often with a vaulted dorsum, and some are strongly flattened (scale-like).

Sphaeromatidae are browsers or detritus feeders. Xynosphaera appear to have incisory mandibles; Xynosphaera colemani burrows into the tissue of alcyonacean corals. Some genera of Sphaeromatidae associate with sponges, particularly Oxinasphaera.

Genera
The family contains the following genera:

Afrocerceis Müller, 1995
Agostodina Bruce, 1994
Amphoroidea H. Milne-Edwards, 1840
Amphoroidella Baker, 1908
Apemosphaera Bruce, 1994
†Archaeosphaeroma Novák, 1872
Artopoles Barnard, 1920
Austrasphaera Bruce, 2003
Beatricesphaera Wetzer & Bruce, 1999
Benthosphaera Bruce, 1994
Bilistra Sket & Bruce, 2004
Botryias Richardson, 1910
Bregmotypta Bruce, 1994
Caecocassidias Kussakin, 1967
Caecosphaeroma Dollfus, 1896
Calcipila Harrison & Holdich, 1984
Campecopea Leach, 1814
Cassidias Richardson, 1906
Cassidina H. Milne-Edwards, 1840
Cassidinella Whitelegge, 1901
Cassidinidea Hansen, 1905
Cassidinopsis Hansen, 1905
Ceratocephalus Woodward, 1877
Cerceis H. Milne-Edwards, 1840
Cercosphaera Bruce, 1994
Chitonopsis Whitelegge, 1902
Chitonosphaera Kussakin & Malyutina, 1993
Cilicaea Leach, 1818
Cilicaeopsis Hansen, 1905
Cliamenella Kussakin & Malyutina, 1987
†Cyclosphaeroma Woodward, 1890 
Cymodetta Bowman & Kuhne, 1974
Cymodoce Leach, 1814
Cymodocella Pfeffer, 1887
Cymodopsis Baker, 1926
Diclidocella Bruce, 1995
Discerceis Richardson, 1905
Discidina Bruce, 1994
Dynamene Leach, 1814
Dynamenella Hansen, 1905
Dynameniscus Richardson, 1905
Dynamenoides Hurley & Jansen, 1977
Dynamenopsis Baker, 1908
Dynoides Barnard, 1914
†Eocopea Iverson & Chivers, 1984
†Eosphaeroma Woodward, 1879
Eterocerceis Messana, 1990
Exocerceis Baker, 1926
Exosphaeroides Holdich & Harrison, 1983
Exosphaeroma Stebbing, 1900
Geocerceis Menzies & Glynn, 1968
Gnorimosphaeroma Menzies, 1954
Harrieta Kensley, 1987
Haswellia Miers, 1884
Hemisphaeroma Hansen, 1905
Heterodina Schotte & Kensley, 2005
†Heterosphaeroma Munier-Chalmas, 1872
Holotelson Richardson, 1909
Ischyromene Racovitza, 1908
 Miers, 1876
†Isopodites von Ammon, 1882
Juletta Bruce, 1993
Koremasphaera Bruce, 2003
Kranosphaera Bruce, 1992
Lekanesphaera Verhoeff, 1943
Leptosphaeroma Hilgendorf, 1885
Makarasphaera Bruce, 2005
Margueritta Bruce, 1993
Maricoccus Poore, 1994
Merozoon Sket, 2012
Monolistra Gerstaecker, 1856
Moruloidea Baker, 1908
Naesicopea Stebbing, 1893
Neonaesa Harrison & Holdich, 1982
Neosphaeroma Baker, 1926
Oxinasphaera Bruce, 1997
Paracassidina Baker, 1911
Paracassidinopsis Nobili, 1906
Paracerceis Hansen, 1905
Paracilicaea Stebbing, 1910
Paradella Harrison & Holdich, 1982
Paraimene Javed & Ahmed, 1988
Paraleptosphaeroma Buss & Iverson, 1981
Parasphaeroma Stebbing, 1902
Parisocladus Barnard, 1914
Pedinura Bruce, 2003
Pistorius Harrison & Holdich, 1982
Platycerceis Baker, 1926
Platynympha Harrison, 1984
Platysphaera Holdich & Harrison, 1981
Pooredoce Bruce, 2009
†Protosphaeroma Bachmayer, 1949
Pseudocerceis Harrison & Holdich, 1982
Pseudosphaeroma Chilton, 1909
Ptyosphaera Holdich & Harrison, 1983
Scutuloidea Chilton, 1883
Sphaeramene Barnard, 1914
Sphaeroma Latreille, 1802
Sphaeromopsis Holdich & Jones, 1973
Stathmos Barnard, 1940
Striella Glynn, 1968
Syncassidina Baker, 1928
Thermosphaeroma Cole & Bane, 1978
Tholozodium Eleftheriou, Holdich & Harrison, 1980
†Triassphaeroma Basso & Tintori, 1995
Waiteolana Baker, 1926
Xynosphaera Bruce, 1994
Zuzara Leach, 1818

See also
Sphaeroma terebrans

References

External links
 
 "Cute As Buttons"

 
Crustacean families